Nakai (written: ,  or ) is a Japanese surname. Notable people with the surname include:

, Japanese cinematographer
, Japanese professional baseball infielder
, Japanese shogi player
, Japanese politician
, Japanese politician
, Japanese voice actor
, Japanese actress
, Japanese actor
, Japanese singer, actor and host
, Japanese aesthetician, film theorist, librarian, and social activist
, general in the Imperial Japanese Army
, Japanese politician
, Japanese actress, director
, Japanese writer
 R. Carlos Nakai (born 1946), Native American flautist
, former Japanese football player
, Japanese judoka
, Japanese botanist
, Japanese former handball player
, Japanese baseball player
, Japanese mathematician, originator of the Nakai conjecture 
, Japanese football player
, Japanese artist
, retired Japanese shooto practitioner and mixed martial artist
, Japanese badminton player

Nakai is a surname among the Navajo people of the American Southwest. Notable people with the surname Nakai include

 R. Carlos Nakai (born 1946) American musician, nominated for 11 Grammy Awards.

References

Japanese-language surnames